Joseph Vincent Sullivan (August 15, 1919—September 4, 1982) was an American prelate of the Catholic Church. He served as bishop of the Diocese of Baton Rouge in Louisiana from 1974 until his death in 1982. He previously served as an auxiliary bishop of the Diocese of Kansas City-Saint Joseph in Missouri from 1967 to 1974.

Sullivan was credibly accused by several parishioners of sexual abuse, later admitted by the Diocese of Baton Rouge.

Biography

Early life 
Joseph Sullivan was born in Kansas City, Missouri, to John Lawrence and Anastasia Agnes (née Presser) Sullivan. He received his early education at local Catholic schools, and began his seminary formation in Missouri. He then studied at the Sulpician Seminary of the Catholic University of America in Washington, D.C.

Priesthood 
Sullivan was ordained to the priesthood on June 1, 1946. He earned a doctorate in theology from the Catholic University in 1949.As a priest of the Diocese of Kansas City-St. Joseph, Sullivan served as assistant superintendent (1948–50) and superintendent (1951–57) of diocesan schools. From 1957 to 1967, Sullivan was chancellor of the diocese.

Auxiliary Bishop of Kansas City-St. Joseph 
On March 4, 1967, he was appointed auxiliary bishop of Kansas City-St. Joseph and titular bishop of Thagamuta by Pope Paul VI. He received his episcopal consecration on the following April 3 from Bishop Charles Herman Helmsing, with Cardinal John Cody and Bishop Joseph M. Marling serving as co-consecrators. As an auxiliary bishop, he also served as vicar general of the diocese.

Bishop of Baton Rouge 
Following the resignation of Bishop Robert Emmet Tracy, Sullivan was named the second bishop of the Diocese of Baton Rouge by Paul VI on August 8, 1974. His installation took place at the Cathedral of St. Joseph in Baton Roughe on September 4 of that year. He was strongly conservative and emphasized fidelity to Catholic doctrine. In February 1979, he refused to allow theologian Charles Curran, whom Sullivan denounced as "heretical" and "not in accord with Catholic teaching", to speak at the Catholic Campus Ministry at Louisiana State University in Baton Rouge. After he removed the Claretian Fathers from the chaplaincy at Louisiana State University in March 1979, 51 priests filed a list of grievances with the Holy See.

In February 1981, Sullivan issued a pastoral letter in which he declared that ministries to divorced and remarried Catholics "may not witness, explicitly or implicitly, that the living Church condones the marital lifestyle of those living in an invalid marriage." An outspoken supporter of the anti-abortion movement, he frequently condemned abortion and euthanasia. In 1981, Sullivan was the only Catholic bishop to vote against providing the endorsement of the National Conference of Catholic Bishops to the Hatch Amendment, saying, "Plain logic tells us this is a compromise, and I don't think we have to accept a compromise." He also promoted Catholic education, establishing elementary schools and planning for a new high school.

Death and legacy 
Joseph Sullivan died in Baton Rouge on September 4, 1982, at age 63.

In October 2009, the Diocese of Baton Rouge paid $225,000 to settle a lawsuit in which a man from Houston, Texas, claimed he was sexually abused by Sullivan as a seminarian between 1978 and 1982. A Louisiana high school named after Sullivan changed its name in 2005 following the settlement of a separate lawsuit alleging Sullivan had sexually abused a minor boy.

References

Episcopal succession

1919 births
1982 deaths
20th-century Roman Catholic bishops in the United States
American Roman Catholic clergy of Irish descent
People from Kansas City, Missouri
Roman Catholic Diocese of Baton Rouge
Roman Catholic Diocese of Kansas City–Saint Joseph
Catholic University of America alumni
Religious leaders from Missouri
Catholics from Missouri